"Mountains" is a song by pop music group LSD. The song was released on 1 November 2018, and marks the group's fourth release, following "Genius", "Audio", and "Thunderclouds".

The song was used in musical film Music, co-written and directed by Sia. In the film, it is performed by Kate Hudson and Leslie Odom Jr.

Release and promotion
Ground members shared a short animated teaser audio and video clip on October 29, 2018. Diplo shared part of the song on Instagram on October 31, and the track was released on November 1.

Reception
DJ Mag described the song as "electronic pop goodness".

Credits and personnel 
Credits adapted from the liner notes of LSD.

 Sia – writer, lyricist, vocals
 Labrinth – writer, lyricist, vocals, producer, programming, instrumentation, engineer
 Diplo – writer, producer, programming, instrumentation
 Nathaniel "Detonate" Ledwidge – producer, programming, instrumentation
 Boaz van de Beatz – additional production
 Gustave Rudman – additional production
 Yoda Francesco – additional production
 Bart Schoudel – engineer

 Luke Dimond – engineer
 Chris Galland – mix engineer
 Robin Florent – assistant mix engineer
 Scott Desmarais – assistant mix engineer
 Manny Marroquin – mixer
 Randy Merrill – masterer

See also
 Diplo discography
 Labrinth discography
 Sia discography

References

2018 singles
2018 songs
Electropop songs
LSD (group) songs
Song recordings produced by Diplo
Song recordings produced by Labrinth
Songs written by Sia (musician)
Songs written by Labrinth
Songs written by Diplo